is a Japanese football player. He plays for Zweigen Kanazawa.

Playing career
Motofumi Ohashi joined to Zweigen Kanazawa in 2010.

References

External links

1987 births
Living people
Ryutsu Keizai University alumni
Association football people from Saitama Prefecture
Japanese footballers
J2 League players
J3 League players
Japan Football League players
Zweigen Kanazawa players
Association football goalkeepers